Carina Görlin, born 17 February 1963 in Borlänge, Sweden, is a Swedish former cross-country skier who competed from 1991 to 1994.  Competing at the 1992 Winter Olympics in Albertville, she had her best career finish of seventh in the 4 × 5 km relay and her best individual finish of 14th in the 5 km.

Görlin's best finish at the FIS Nordic World Ski Championships was tenth in the 15 km event at Val di Fiemme in 1991.  Her best World Cup finish was 12th twice, both in 5 km events in 1991.

Görlin's best finish was ninth on three occasions in 10 km events in Sweden from 1992 to 1994.

In 1993, she won Tjejvasan.

Cross-country skiing results
All results are sourced from the International Ski Federation (FIS).

Olympic Games

World Championships

World Cup

Season standings

Team podiums

 1 victory 
 1 podium

References

External links 
 
 Women's 4 x 5 km cross-country relay Olympic results: 1976-2002 

1963 births
Cross-country skiers at the 1992 Winter Olympics
Living people
Swedish female cross-country skiers
Hudiksvalls IF skiers
20th-century Swedish women